Rahma most commonly refers to an Arabic name, which may refer to:

Al-Rahma mosque, on Hatherley Street, Liverpool, England
Malak al-Rahma, a classic 1946 Egyptian film directed and written by Youssef Wahbi

People
Anas Abu Rahma, Palestinian children's author
Al-Zubayr Rahma Mansur, Sudanese 19th century slave trader and politician
Kareem Rahma, American media figure
Rahma Ali, Pakistani singer
Rahma bint Hassan, Jordanian princess
Rahma el-Dennaoui, Australian girl who was abducted
Rahma El Siddig Mustafa, Sudanese disability rights activist
Rahmah el Yunusiyah, Indonesian educational activist and nationalist leader
Rahma Ghars, Tunisian footballer
Rahmah ibn Jabir al-Jalhami, early modern Arab pirate and commander
Rahma Hassan, Egyptian actress
Rahma Haruna, Nigerian photo subject
Rahma Riad, Iraqi singer
Rahma Tusa, Ethiopian long-distance runner

Religion
Rahma (Mandaeism), a Mandaic word referring to Mandaean devotional prayers

See also

Rahman (name)